Phomen Singh ( – 27 May 1935) was a notable New Zealand confectioner. He was born in Punjab, India, in about 1869.

References

1869 births
1935 deaths
Confectioners
Indian emigrants to New Zealand
New Zealand people of Punjabi descent